René Savoie (9 February 1896 – 29 April 1961) was a Swiss ice hockey player Goaltender who competed in the 1920 Summer Olympics and in the 1924 Winter Olympics. In 1920, he participated with the Swiss ice hockey team in the Summer Olympic tournament. He wore a cardigan and a shirt and tie on the ice. Four years later, he was also a member of the Swiss team in the first Winter Olympics tournament.

See also
List of Olympic men's ice hockey players for Switzerland

References

External links
 

1896 births
1961 deaths
Ice hockey players at the 1920 Summer Olympics
Ice hockey players at the 1924 Winter Olympics
Olympic ice hockey players of Switzerland